Arcadia Park is a small park in Odesa, Ukraine, located up to 2014 in the historical quarter Arcadia, at the end of the Genuezska Street, down from the 10th of April  Square, on the coast of the Gulf of Odesa.

The park is known for its numerous restaurants, bars and nightclubs. The famous beach Arcadia Beach is located here. The best known place in the park is its Central Avenue, which threads down from the Genuezska Street to the sea coast, where the beach is located. 

Extensive reconstruction of the park, mostly on its Central Avenue, was started in January 2014. Nearly all the plants and greenery were demolished, the central avenue was covered with granite pavement tiles. Also, massive marble fountains and planters were constructed. The fountains are covered by plywood in the winter time. A little trees, mainly pines and palms, transported from Italy, were planted.

Gallery

Sources 

 Парк Аркадия
 В Аркадии начинают строить новую центральную аллею
 В Аркадии презентовали обновленную аллею: с пальмами и магазинами, но без тени
 Новая Аркадия — долгий путь к морю

Parks in Ukraine
Parks and gardens in Odesa
Arcadia (Odesa)
Tourist attractions in Odesa